Gerrhopilus thurstoni, or Thurston's worm snake, is a species of harmless blind snake in the family Gerrhopilidae. The species is native to western India.  No recognized subspecies exist.

Etymology
The specific name, thurstoni, is in honor of British zoologist Edgar Thurston.

Geographic range
In western India, G. thurstoni has been found in southern Goa, from sea level to approximately 1,200 m elevation (4,000 feet), and in Kerala.

The type locality given is "Nilgiri Hills, Brit. Ostindien ".

Habitat
The preferred natural habitat of G. thurstoni is forest.

Description
The body is light brown or yellowish dorsally, and paler ventrally. The snout and the anal region are whitish.

Reproduction
G. thurstoni is oviparous.

References

Further reading

Boettger O (1890). "Neue Schlange aus Ostindien ". Berichte über die Senckenbergische Naturforschende Gesellschaft in Frankfurt am Main 1890: 297-298. (Typhlops thurstoni, new species). (in German and Latin).
Boulenger GA (1893). Catalogue of the Snakes in the British Museum (Natural History). Volume I., Containing the Families Typhlopidæ ... London: Trustees of the British Museum (Natural History). (Taylor & Francis, printers). xiii + 448 pp. + Plates I-XXVIII. ("Typhlops thurstonii [sic]", p. 26).
Hedges SB, Marion AB, Lipp KM, Marin J, Vidal N (2014). "A taxonomic framework for typhlopid snakes from the Caribbean and other regions (Reptilia, Squamata)". Caribbean Herpetology (49): 1-61. (Gerrhopilus thurstoni, new combination).
Procter JB (1924). "Description of a new Typhlops from S. India and Notes on Brachyophidium and Platyplectrurus ". Annals and Magazine of Natural History, Ninth Series 13: 139-142. (Typhlops walli, new species).
Smith MA (1943). The Fauna of British India, Ceylon and Burma, Including the Whole of the Indo-Chinese Sub-region. Reptilia and Amphibia. Vol. III.—Serpentes. London: Secretary of State for India. (Taylor and Francis, printers). xii + 583 pp. (Typhlops thurstoni, p. 49).

Gerrhopilus
Reptiles of India
Endemic fauna of the Western Ghats
Reptiles described in 1890